Rakahanga is a Cook Islands electoral division returning one member to the Cook Islands Parliament.  Its current representative is Piho Rua, who has held the seat since 2004.

The electorate consists of the island of Rakahanga.

Members of Parliament for Penrhyn
Unless otherwise stated, all MPs terms began and ended at general elections.

Election results

2010 election

2006 election

2004 election

References

Cook Islands electorates